Daniel P. Ward (August 30, 1918 – April 23, 1995) was an American jurist.

Born in Chicago, Illinois, Ward graduated from Marmion Academy in Aurora, Illinois. He went to St. Viator College and then received his law degree from DePaul University College of Law. During World War II, Ward served in the United States Army. He was a professor of law at Southeastern University and was an assistant United States Attorney. He was also a professor of law at DePaul University College of Law. From 1960 to 1966, Ward was state's attorney for Cook County, Illinois and was a Democrat. Ward then served on the Illinois Supreme Court from 1966 until 1991 and was chief justice of the court from 1976 to 1979. He lived in Westchester, Illinois. Ward died in Maywood, Illinois.

References

1918 births
1995 deaths
Chief Justices of the Illinois Supreme Court
District attorneys in Illinois
Illinois Democrats
Politicians from Chicago
DePaul University College of Law alumni
DePaul University faculty
20th-century American judges
People from Westchester, Illinois
Justices of the Illinois Supreme Court